Jimmy Klingler (born February 17, 1972) is a former American football quarterback who played one season with the Birmingham Barracudas of the Canadian Football League. He played college football at the University of Houston and attended Stratford High School in Houston, Texas. He was also a member of the Texas Terror of the Arena Football League.

College career
Klingler played for the Houston Cougars from 1991 to 1993. He led NCAA Division I-A in total offense with 3,768 yards in 1992. He also led Division I-A in total touchdowns and passing touchdowns with 32.

Professional career

Birmingham Barracudas
Klingler played for the Birmingham Barracudas in 1995, recording four touchdowns on 645 passing yards.

Texas Terror
Klingler played for the Texas Terror in 1996, recording seven touchdowns on 514 passing yards.

Coaching career

Dickinson High School
Klingler was a coach for the Dickinson Gators from 1997 to 2001.

MacArthur High School
Klingler was quarterbacks coach at MacArthur High School in 2002.

South Houston High School
Klingler was offensive coordinator for the South Houston Trojans from 2003 to 2006.

Manvel High School
Klingler served as offensive coordinator of the Manvel Mavericks from 2007 to 2012.

New Caney High School
Klingler was offensive coordinator of the New Caney Eagles in 2013.

Blinn College
Klingler became offensive coordinator of the Blinn Buccaneers in 2014.

Personal life
Klingler's brother David also played quarterback for the Houston Cougars. His son, Cory, played football for the Rice Owls. His daughter, Baylee, played college softball at Washington.

See also
 List of NCAA major college football yearly passing leaders
 List of NCAA major college football yearly total offense leaders

References

External links
 Just Sports Stats
 College stats

Living people
1972 births
American football quarterbacks
Birmingham Barracudas players
Blinn Buccaneers football coaches
Houston Cougars football players
Texas Terror players
High school football coaches in Texas
Sportspeople from Lima, Ohio
Sportspeople from Houston
Players of American football from Ohio
Players of American football from Houston